Events from the year 1213 in Ireland.

Incumbent
Lord: John

Births

Events
 Henry de Loundres (died 1228) became Archbishop of Dublin